The 1914–15 National Challenge Cup was the second tournament of the modern-day Lamar Hunt U.S. Open Cup. Many more teams - 80 - competed in 1915 after the success of the 1913–14 tournament. St. Louis and California were the only major soccer-playing regions without a representative. Bethlehem Steel won the tournament.

Bracket
Home teams listed on top of bracket

Final

 Bill Duncan
 Bob Morrison
 Thomas Murray
 Fred Pepper
 James Campbell
 Jock Ferguson
 Sam Fletcher
 Neil Clarke
 Robert Millar (c)
 James Ford
 Tommy Fleming
 Manager:  Horace Lewis

 Frank Mather
 Nicholas
 Harry McWilliams
 John Broadbent
 Donegan
 Neville
 Thomas Campion
 Albert Lonie 
 Roddy O'Halloran (c)
 John McQueen
 Thomas McGreevey
 Manager:  Thomas McCamphill

See also
1915 American Cup

Sources
USOpenCup.com
New York Times

References

External links
 Open Cup Finals

Nat
U.S. Open Cup
1914–15 domestic association football cups